The 1900 United States presidential election in West Virginia took place on November 6, 1900. All contemporary 45 states were part of the 1900 United States presidential election. West Virginia voters chose six electors to the Electoral College, which selected the president and vice president.

 West Virginia was won by the Republican nominees, incumbent President William McKinley of Ohio and his running mate Theodore Roosevelt of New York.

Results

Results by county

References

West Virginia
1900
1900 West Virginia elections